Dhirubhai Shah (18 December 1952 – 17 March 2008)  was a politician from Gujarat, who was elected speaker of the Tenth Gujarat Legislative Assembly from 19 March 1998 to 27 December 2002. He was the youngest speaker in the history of the Gujarat Legislative Assembly.

In 2011 his portrait was unveiled by then Chief Minister of Gujarat at Gandhidham.

Early life and career
Dhirubhai Shah was born into a Jain family in the village of Bela, Taluka-Rapar, District of Kutch, in Gujarat state. After obtaining degrees in commerce and law, he started his legal career in Gandhidham. Public contacts encouraged him to consider a career in politics. His hard work and commitment to the development of the Kutch region made him a leader in his community.

Career
He built a firm base to his political philosophy during his tenure as the leader of the opposition in Gandhidham municipality. He served as its president and vice president of Gujarat Nagarpalika Parishad for eight consecutive years. 
Dhirubhai Shah has attended a number of national and international conferences. Besides the All India Presiding Officers' Conferences in New Delhi, Hyderabad, Chandigarh, and Bangalore, he has attended the 44th and 45th Commonwealth Parliamentary Conferences held in Wellington, New Zealand and Trinidad and Tobago respectively. He was elected as the Asian Region Member of the Executive Committee of the Commonwealth Parliamentary Association (C.P.A.) in September 2000 and attended the 47th Commonwealth Parliamentary Conference held in Canberra, Australia. On 19 November 2003 he was appointed chairman of the Gujarat Finance Commission.

Awards and honors
He was honoured with the Glory of India award in 1998 by the India International Friendship Society at a seminar on "Economic Development and National Integrity" held in New Delhi. He was also given the Gujarat Gaurav Award in 1999 in the field of parliamentary procedure by the International Association of Educators for World Peace, a United Nations agency. He also had the honour of attending the Golden Jubilee celebrations of Queen Elizabeth II, the patron of the C.P.A., in London in March 2002 and represented India on the occasion. He also attended the mid-year meeting of the C.P.A. held in Kiribati in 2002.

Death and memorials
Dhirubhai Shah died at his residence in Ahmedabad in Gujarat, India on 17 March 2008 (11:00pm – 11:30pm approx.) suffering from a sudden heart seizure while he was with his family, suffering a heart attack at his daughter's wedding on 29 January 2005 and slipping into a coma. He was 56 yrs of age. His body was cremated on 18 March 2008 at noon. A public prayer was held in his remembrance at Kutchi Bhuvan, Paldi, Ahmedabd on 19 March 2008. Also a similar prayer session was held in his hometown, Gandhidham on 21 March 2008.

On 25 March 2008 there was a special condolence session was taken in the Gujarat Legislative Assembly. Narendra Modi, Chief Minister of Gujarat and Speaker Ashok Bhatt conveyed the condolences to the family among others, and the house was adjourned for the day. It was a historical moment wherein a high honour was posthumously given to a former speaker of the assembly.

On 20 December 2011 Narendra Modi honoured the statue of Dhirubhai Shah in Gandhidham, Shah's hometown, in Kutch district, a function attended by over 10,000 people. Modi described the late Shah as a man full of life, who lived a fulfilled life. Unveiling his portrait at a function in town, Modi said "Dhirubhai was one of the rare political leaders who combined values, and who never cared for posts or offices of profit or projecting political heirs. His contributions to the Sindhi community in the Gandhidham-Adipur-Kandla belt in Kutch district will be remembered for long." Modi related how Dhirubhai, even after 1,158 days illness, bore a smile of contentment while departing. His death was compared to that of the late Arvindbhai Maniar, Vasantbhai Ganjendra Gadkar and Makarand Desai.

References 

1952 births
2008 deaths
Speakers of the Gujarat Legislative Assembly
People from Gandhidham
Gujarat MLAs 1998–2002
Bharatiya Janata Party politicians from Gujarat